Katonia is a genus of beetles in the family Buprestidae, containing the following species:

 Katonia tricolour (Thery, 1941)
 Katonia usambarae (Obenberger, 1922)

References

Buprestidae genera